Sara Gambai is an ethnic group in Chad and Sudan. They speak Ngambay, a Nilo-Saharan  language. It is a trade language. It is the largest of the Sara languages, also classified as one single language.
 Most are non-Muslim. The population of this ethnicity in Chad possibly exceeds 1,000,000. 
 
Sara people is an ethnic minority within Chad, of which Sara Gambai is part. Other subgroups of the Sara include the Sar, Mbay, Kaba, Gulay and Dai. The Sara Gambai people live in Southern parts of Chad.

References

External Links
Joshua Project

Ethnic groups in Chad
Ethnic groups in Sudan
Sara people